SS R. Ney McNeely was a Liberty ship built in the United States during World War II. She was named after R. Ney McNeely,  a State Representative in North Carolina, a member of the North Carolina Senate, a later the American Consul in Aden.

Construction
R. Ney McNeely was laid down on 9 December 1943, under a Maritime Commission (MARCOM) contract, MC hull 1513, by J.A. Jones Construction, Brunswick, Georgia; she was sponsored by Miss Lanelle Rimes, the winner of a contest sponsored by the shipyard to gather scrap metal to help the war effort, and launched on 29 January 1944.

History
She was allocated to the South Atlantic Steamship Co., on 10 February 1944. On 27 May 1948, she was laid up in the National Defense Reserve Fleet in Wilmington, North Carolina.

Conversion to minesweeper 
She was transferred to the US Navy and withdrawn from the Reserve Fleet on 28 February 1955, to be converted to a Type EC2-S-22a Auxiliary Minesweeper (YAG).

Disposal
On 12 March 1965, she was transferred to the National Defense Reserve Fleet,  James River Group, Lee Hall, Virginia. On 9 June 1972, she was sold to the Union Minerals & Alloy Corp., for $35,212.54, to be scrapped. She was Withdrawn from the fleet on 14 August 1972.

References

Bibliography

 
 
 
 
 

 

Liberty ships
Ships built in Brunswick, Georgia
1944 ships
Wilmington Reserve Fleet
James River Reserve Fleet